Hormizd II (also spelled Hormozd or Ohrmazd) was king (shah) of the Sasanian Empire. He ruled for seven years and five months, from 303 to 309. He was a son and successor of Narseh.

During his reign, the Kingdom of Armenia had recently declared Christianity as its official religion, thus leaving its ancient Zoroastrian heritage that it shared with Sasanian Iran. Hormizd II's reign was also marked by internal turmoil, which he successfully managed to deal with. Hormizd II was also successful in his efforts in the west, defeating and killing the Ghassanid king in Syria. His reign was, however, cut short by the intrigues of the Iranian nobility, who killed him in a secluded place. 

He was succeeded by his son Adur Narseh, who after a few months of reigning was also killed by the nobility. They instead installed Hormizd II's infant son Shapur II on the throne.

Etymology 
The name of Hormizd (also spelled Ōhrmazd, Hormozd) is the Middle Persian version of the name of the supreme deity in Zoroastrianism, known in Avestan as Ahura Mazda. The Old Persian equivalent is Auramazdā, while the Greek transliteration is Hormisdas. The name is attested in Armenian as Ormizd and in Georgian as Urmizd.

Life

Background 

When Hormizd's father Narseh ascended the throne in 293, he had an investiture relief made in Naqsh-e Rostam, where he is depicted as receiving the ring of kingship from a female figure that is frequently assumed to be the goddess Anahita. However, some scholars have suggested that this may be his wife and Hormizd's mother, Shapurdukhtak. The figure standing behind Narseh is most likely Hormizd, due to his cap being the form of that of an animal protome, which was typically worn by Sasanian heirs. Hormizd most likely did not take part in his father's war against the Roman Empire, which ended disastrously for the Sasanians, with Narseh's wife and some of his offspring being captured, forcing him to surrender a handful provinces in Armenia and Mesopotamia in order to have his family members handed back to him. Hormizd may have been same person as Hormizd II Kushanshah, a Sasanian prince who briefly ruled the Kushano-Sasanian Kingdom from 300 to 303. They both minted coins where they were depicted with a winged crown, whilst on the reverse, which usually shows the traditional fire altar flanked by two attendants, also shows a head emerging from the fire, a typical Kushano-Sasanian design which first appears on Sasanian coins during the reign of Hormizd II.

Reign
In 303, Hormizd II ascended the throne, assuming a crown whose features resembled that of the same used by the early Sasanian rulers, such as Bahram II. Not much is known about the reign of Hormizd; he supposedly started out as a cruel ruler but then became benevolent.

This change of behaviour is described by al-Tabari;

 

However, unlike his father, who had returned to the policy of religious tolerance which had been practiced during the reign of first two shahs, Ardashir I and Shapur I, Hormizd persecuted the Manicheans who had lived peacefully during the reign of his father. Hormizd reportedly founded the rural district of Kurang (or Wahisht-Hormozd) near Izeh in the Khuzistan province. Hormizd tried to improve Sasanian relations with Armenia, which had recently under Tiridates III of Armenia declared Christianity as its state religion; he gave his daughter Hormizddukht in marriage to a Mamikonian prince named Vahan.

Hormizd's rock relief at Naqsh-e Rostam in the Pars province (present-day Fars) indicates that there was internal turmoil in the empire during his reign. Hormizd, during the last years of his reign, raided the domains of the Ghassanid king in Syria, whom he tried to extract tribute from. The Ghassanid king as a result tried to get assistance from the Roman emperor, but was killed before Roman reinforcements appeared. Hormizd was reportedly in 309 ambushed and killed by Ghassanid troops whilst he was hunting in the desert. The more probable reason for his death was most likely the Iranian nobility that killed him in a secluded place, and now sought to get rid of his sons as well.

According to the 11th-century Chronicle of Seert, Hormizd declared war against the Romans in order to avenge the defeat of his father, whilst the Chronicle of Arbela states that when the Roman emperor started persecuting his Christian subjects, Hormizd raised a great army, invaded the Roman domains and raided many cities. The credibility of the two sources are doubtful, with the events not being reported in other sources. According to the Iranologist Alireza Shapour Shahbazi, "one may only surmise that it is probably a reflection of Hormozd's alleged raid into Syria."

Succession
After Hormizd's death, he was succeeded by his eldest son Adur Narseh, who, after a brief reign which lasted few months, was killed by some of the nobles of the empire. They then blinded the second, and imprisoned the third (Hormizd, who afterwards escaped to the Roman Empire). The throne was reserved for the unborn child of Hormizd II's wife Ifra Hormizd, which was Shapur II. Shapur II was reportedly the only king in history to be crowned in utero, as the legend claims that the crown was placed upon his mother's womb while she was pregnant. However, according to Shahbazi, it is unlikely that Shapur was crowned as king while still in his mother's womb, since the nobles could not have known of his sex at that time. He further states that Shapur was born forty days after his father's death, and that the nobles killed Adur Narseh and crowned Shapur II in order to gain greater control of the empire, which they were able to do until Shapur II reached his majority at the age of 16.

Offspring
Hormizd II was one of the Sasanian kings with the most children, which he had from his wife Ifra-Hormizd, and several other wives and concubines:
Prince Adur Narseh (3rd century – 309), the ninth king of the Sasanian Empire.
Prince Shapur II (309 – 379), the tenth king of the Sasanian Empire.
Prince Adurfrazgird (??? – 4th century), governor of southern Arbayistan.
Prince Zamasp (??? – 4th century), governor of northern Arbayistan.
Prince Shapur Sakanshah (??? – 4th century), governor of Sakastan.
Prince Hormizd (??? – 4th century), imprisoned by the Iranian nobility and later defected to the Roman Empire.
Prince Ardashir II (309 – 383), the eleventh king of the Sasanian Empire.
Prince Narseh (??? – 4th century), briefly occupied the Armenian throne in the mid-330s.
Princess Hormizddukht (??? – 4th century), married the Mamikonian prince Vahan.

Notes

References

Sources
 
 
 
 
 
 

 
 
 
 
 
 
 
 
 
 
 

309 deaths
4th-century Sasanian monarchs
3rd-century births
Murdered Persian monarchs
Shahnameh characters
4th-century murdered monarchs